The Nokia N93i (also known as the N93i-1) is a smartphone produced by Nokia, announced on 8 January 2007 and released the same month. It is part of the Nseries line and is a redesign of the Nokia N93. The N93i runs on Symbian OS version 9.1, with the S60 3rd Edition user interface. Like the N93, it is a clamshell and swivel design with a camera and landscape position.

The N95's improved camera capabilities have led to it being seldom called the N93i's successor, though Nokia have never made another swivel-style phone since.

Redesign 

The N93i is more of a redesign, than a successor to the N93. The improvements include:

 A sleeker design
 Reduced size and weight
 16M colour LCD (256K colours on the Nokia N93)
 Side joystick (D-Pad on the N93)
 A recessed lanyard mount
 A flush fitting, more secure miniSD card slot cover
 A tethered cover for the Pop-Port connector
 Relocation of the main speaker to the base unit
 A redesigned battery cover
 A proper SIM card recess
 A charging LED underneath the mirror top

Features 
The Nokia N93i features a 3.2-megapixel camera, Carl Zeiss optics, 3x optical zoom and digital video stabilization. The ability to create "DVD-like videos" at 30 frames per second with MPEG4 technology and share them on the 2.4-inch display. The Nokia N93i can be connected to a compatible TV using direct TV out connectivity or via Wireless LAN and UPnP technology. The N93i also features a digital stereo microphone, music player and FM stereo radio, dual mode WCDMA/GSM and triband GSM coverage on up to five continents (EDGE/GSM 900/1800/1900 + WCDMA 2100 MHz networks).

Accelerometer 
The N93i includes a built-in accelerometer much like the Nokia N95. Third-party applications have started to make use of the built in accelerometer including:

RotateMe which automatically changes the screen rotation when the phone is tilted.
NokMote which uses the accelerometer as a D-Pad and moves in the direction of tilt, much like the Wii Remote.
ShutUp which turns the phone on Silent when it is turned face down.
ShakeMe which can lock the keypad, toggle Bluetooth, turn on the backlight or toggle Silent Profile
ShakeLock which will lock the phone when it is shaken.

Camera 

The camera is the main focus of the Nokia N93i, with video recording being one of the main aspects of the phone it also has high quality stereo sound which is recorded by the two microphones located at the top of the phone next to the power button.

Main camera
Resolution: 2048 x 1536
Focal length 4.5 mm
F-Stop/Aperture f/3.3
Focus range 10 cm to infinity
Digital Zoom: 20 x
Optical Zoom: 3 x
Image Format: JPEG/Exif
Feature: Auto Focus, Carl Zeiss Optics, Flash, Self Timer
Video Resolution: 640 x 480
Video Frame Rate: 30 frame/s
Video Zoom: 8 x
Video Format: H.263, H.264/AVC, MPEG-4
Audio Format: H.253, H.244

Secondary camera
Resolution: 288 x 352
Image Format: JPEG/Exif
Video Resolution: 176 x 144
Video Frame Rate: 15 frame/s
Video Zoom: 2 x
Video Format: H.263

N-Gage 
The N93i is not an N-Gage 2.0 compatible device unlike other models such as the Nokia N81 and Nokia N95. The N-Gage application was unreleased for the Nokia N93i. The N93i has a 3D graphics chip. Unlike other models, the N93 and N93i make use of all of the keys on the keypad due to their design, all keys can be used in both landscape and portrait mode, although being a little less accessible.

Due to its incompatibility with the N-Gage application, electronics enthusiasts made a modified version of N-Gage which is compatible with Nokia N93i.

Popular culture 
An N93i is seen in the 2007 movie, Transformers. It is the device used to demonstrate the AllSpark's capability of turning any electronic device into a living robot. This phone turned out to be a Decepticon tiny but deadly robot.

The N93i used a different marketing strategy by incorporating Dallas based punk rock band Greyskull in its APAC campaign. Running an on-line competition in which contestants could submit their own videos to the band's songs. Ads featuring the band Greyskull were run in newspapers and commercials on MTV Asia.

During the 2007 Cannes Lions Advertising Festival, camera crews using Nokia N93i devices tagged along with the Young Creative Film Competitors on their 48-hour mission to shoot a 30-second commercial, also using the Nokia N93i, for MTV SWITCH, a campaign from MTV Networks International designed to educate and encourage alternative options to help save the planet. With 40 hours of content filmed on the Nokia N93i, the footage was edited into an exclusive behind the scenes documentary, "Short Film Shootout: Cannes", which was available for broadcast on MTV's 61 TV channels across 161 countries on 20 December 2007.

Reviews 
 All About Symbian N93i Review
 Phone Arena N93i Review
 N93 and N93i Reviews and specifications round-up 

N-Gage (service) compatible devices
Nokia smartphones
Nokia N93i
Nokia Nseries